William Malbank or William de Malbanc may refer to:

William Malbank, 1st Baron of Wich Malbank
William Malbank, 3rd Baron of Wich Malbank (c. 1125–1176)

See also
Malbon, the surname used by the descendants of the first William Malbank